Andrei Alexandru Florean (born 3 April 1992) is a Romanian professional footballer who plays as a right midfielder.

Club career
Florean made his Liga I debut playing for Săgeata Năvodari on 20 July 2013 in a match against Gaz Metan Mediaș.

International career
On 29 February 2012, he made his debut for the Romania U-21 in a friendly against Czech Republic.

References

External links
 
 

1992 births
Living people
People from Comănești
Romanian footballers
Association football midfielders
Romania youth international footballers
Romania under-21 international footballers
Liga I players
Liga II players
Liga III players
Nemzeti Bajnokság I players
CF Liberty Oradea players
CS ACU Arad players
FC UTA Arad players
FC Bihor Oradea players
AFC Săgeata Năvodari players
Kaposvári Rákóczi FC players
Lombard-Pápa TFC footballers
CS Gaz Metan Mediaș players
CS Știința Miroslava players
Romanian expatriate footballers
Expatriate footballers in Hungary
Romanian expatriate sportspeople in Hungary